The Royal Palace of Naples is a palace, museum, and historical tourist destination located in central Naples, southern Italy.

It was one of the four residences near Naples used by the House of Bourbon during their rule of the Kingdom of Naples (1735–1816) and later the Kingdom of the Two Sicilies (1816-1861). The others were the palaces of Caserta, Capodimonte overlooking Naples and Portici on the slopes of Vesuvius.

History 
The palace is on the site of an earlier residence, which had housed the former viceroy Don Pedro de Toledo, Marquis of Villafranca. Construction on the present building was begun in the 17th century by the architect Domenico Fontana. Intended to house King Philip III of Spain on a visit never fulfilled to this part of his kingdom, instead it initially housed the Viceroy Fernando Ruiz de Castro, Count of Lemos. By 1616, the facade had been completed, and by 1620, the interior was frescoed by Battistello Caracciolo, Giovanni Balducci, and Belisario Corenzio. The decoration of the Royal Chapel of the Assumption (Cappella Reale dell'Assunta) was not completed until 1644 by Antonio Picchiatti.

In 1734, with the arrival of Charles III of Spain to Naples, the palace became the royal residence of the Bourbons. On the occasion of his marriage to Maria Amalia of Saxony in 1738, Francesco De Mura and Domenico Antonio Vaccaro helped remodel the interior. It was Charles who build the other three palaces in locations more peripheral to the city center. Further modernization took place under Ferdinand I of the Two Sicilies. In 1768, on the occasion of his marriage to Maria Carolina of Austria, under the direction of Ferdinando Fuga, the great hall was rebuilt and the court theater added.  During the second half of the 18th century, a "new wing" was added, which in 1927 became the Vittorio Emanuele III National Library. By the 18th century, the royal residence was moved to Reggia of Caserta, as that inland town was more defensible from naval assault, as well as more distant from the often-rebellious populace of Naples.

During the Napoleonic occupation the palace was enriched by Joachim Murat and his wife, Caroline Bonaparte, with Neoclassic decorations and furnishings. However, a fire in 1837 damaged many rooms, and required restoration from 1838 to 1858 under the direction of Gaetano Genovese. Further additions of a Party Wing and a Belvedere were made in this period. At the corner of the palace with San Carlo Theatre, a new facade was created that obscured the viceroyal palace of Pedro de Toledo.

In 1922, it was decided (by the Decree of the Minister Antonino Anile) to transfer here the contents of the National Library (until then in the palace of National Archaeologic Museum). The transfer of library collections was made by 1925.

The library suffered from bombing during World War II and the subsequent military occupation of the building caused serious damage.  Today, the palace and adjacent grounds house the famous Teatro San Carlo, the smaller Teatrino di Corte (recently restored), the Biblioteca Nazionale Vittorio Emanuele III, a museum, and offices, including those of the regional tourist board.

Statues of kings of Naples
In 1888, King Umberto I of Savoy made changes to the western façade side of the building (fronting on Piazza del Plebiscito), by displaying in niches a series of statues of prominent rulers of Naples since the foundation of the Kingdom of Naples in the 12th century. The statues are displayed in chronological order, based on the dynasty of each ruler. The series starts with Roger the Norman (sculpted by Emilio Franceschi), and ends with Vittorio Emanuele II, the tallest statue and the last to be added (sculpted by Francesco Jerace).

The other figures represent:
 Frederick II Hohenstaufen (by Emanuele Caggiano)
 Charles I of Anjou (sculpted by Tommaso Solari)
 Alfonse of Aragon (sculpted by Achille D'Orsi)
 Emperor Charles V (sculpted by Vincenzo Groan)
 Charles III of Spain (sculpted by Raffaele Belliazzi)
 Joachim Murat (sculpted by Giovanni Battista Amendola)

None of the statues refers to the Bourbon dynasty, not even Charles of Bourbon, who is actually engraved with the name of Charles III.

See also 
 List of Baroque residences

References

External links

 Royal Palace of Naples - Official website
 Royal Palace of Naples

 
Houses completed in 1616
Royal residences in the Kingdom of Naples
Palaces in Naples
Baroque palaces in Italy
Tourist attractions in Naples
Museums in Naples
1616 establishments in the Kingdom of Sicily
1616 establishments in Italy
Joachim Murat